Aporrhiza is a genus of flowering plants belonging to the family Sapindaceae.

Its native range is Tropical Africa.

Species:

Aporrhiza lastoursvillensis 
Aporrhiza letestui 
Aporrhiza multijuga 
Aporrhiza paniculata 
Aporrhiza talbotii 
Aporrhiza tessmannii 
Aporrhiza urophylla

References

Sapindaceae
Sapindaceae genera